The Ghab Plain (literally: Forest Plain) is a fertile depression lying mainly in the Al-Suqaylabiyah District in northwest Syria. The Orontes River, flowing north, enters the Plain near Muhradah, around 25 km north-west of Hama.

The valley was flooded for centuries by the waters of the Orontes River, which rendered it a swamp. The "Ghab project", beginning in the 1950s, drained the valley to make it habitable, arable land, providing an extra  of irrigated farmland.

The valley separates the al-Ansariyah mountains in the west from the Zawiyah mountain range and the plateau region to the east.

Fisheries
Before its drainage, the Ghab was the center of the catfish (Silurus glanis) (sallōr or samak aswad) fisheries of the Orontes valley.

Ghab project

The project started in 1953 and is considered one of the most important hydraulic projects in northern Syria. Owing to a slight slope (0.10%) in the Orontes in the area of al-Asharinah, the river did not provide enough water to the surrounding territories. The project drained the plain where the River Orontes flowed. The plain was entirely drained in 1968 and provided 11,000 families with lands.

The Ghab project made large areas suitable for agriculture, and new irrigation systems were employed. The system included barrages, canal networks for irrigation and canal networks for drainage. Large barrages were built in Mahardah, Zayzun, Qarqur and other villages.

Other advantages of the Ghab project were the improvements in the systems of communication through the building of road and rail networks, previously not possible due to the swamps. In addition, malaria decreased because there was no longer stagnant water.

Al-Ruj Plain
Northeast of the Ghab Plain is found another smaller plain, known as al-Ruj Plain (Rouj basin). It is located between the Ghab Plain, and Amouk Plain. This is an agriculturally prosperous enclave just west of the town of Idlib. Many ancient archaeological sites are located there.

References

Bibliography

 
Plains of Syria
Hama Governorate
Idlib Governorate